Kelch-like protein 3 is a protein in humans that is encoded by the KLHL3 gene. Alternative splicing results in multiple transcript variants encoding distinct isoforms.

Function 

This gene is ubiquitously expressed and encodes a full-length protein which has an N-terminal BTB domain followed by a BACK domain and six kelch-like repeats in the C-terminus. These kelch-like repeats promote substrate ubiquitination of bound proteins via interaction of the BTB domain with the CUL3 (cullin 3) component of a cullin-RING E3 ubiquitin ligase (CRL) complex.

Clinical significance 

Mutations in this gene cause pseudohypoaldosteronism type IID (PHA2D); a rare Mendelian syndrome featuring hypertension, hyperkalaemia  and metabolic acidosis.

References

Further reading 

 
 
 
 

Kelch proteins